This is a list of Mexican football transfers for the 2022 summer transfer window, grouped by club. It includes football transfers related to clubs from the Liga BBVA MX.

Liga BBVA MX

América

In:

Out:

Atlas

In:

Out:

Atlético San Luis

In:

Out:

Cruz Azul

In:

Out:

Guadalajara

In:

Out:

Juárez

In:

Out:

León

In:

}

Out:

Mazatlán

In:

Out:

Monterrey

In:

Out:

Necaxa

In:

Out:

Pachuca

In:

Out:

Puebla

In:

Out:

Querétaro

In:

Out:

Santos Laguna

In:

Out:

Tijuana

In:

Out:

Toluca

In:

Out:

UANL

In:

Out:

UNAM

In:

Out:

References 

Summer 2022
Mexico
Tran